Diogo Eurico Vaz de Bacelar da Fonseca e Costa (born 23 August 1997) is a Portuguese sailor. He competed in the 2020 Summer Olympics.

Costa placed second in the 2021 470 World Championships with Pedro Costa, qualifying the pair for the 2020 Olympics.

References

External links
 
 
 

1997 births
Living people
Portuguese male sailors (sport)
Olympic sailors of Portugal
Sailors at the 2020 Summer Olympics – 470
Sportspeople from Porto